Ailsa Farms, also known as Haledon Hall and Hobart Manor, is a historic place located in Wayne, Passaic County, New Jersey, United States. Ailsa Farms was purchased by the state of New Jersey in 1948 from the family of Garret Hobart, 24th vice president of the United States. It is now on the campus of William Paterson University. The original manor house, built in 1877, was the weekend retreat and summer residence of the Hobart family. It was greatly expanded in 1915 following a design by Paterson architect Fred Wesley Wentworth. Today the building is known as Hobart Manor and houses the university's Office of the President and Office of Institutional Advancement.  Ailsa Farms was added to the National Register of Historic Places on April 30, 1976.

See also
National Register of Historic Places listings in Passaic County, New Jersey

References

Houses on the National Register of Historic Places in New Jersey
Houses completed in 1877
Houses in Passaic County, New Jersey
National Register of Historic Places in Passaic County, New Jersey
Wayne, New Jersey
New Jersey Register of Historic Places
William Paterson University
1877 establishments in New Jersey